In quantum mechanics, separable states are quantum states belonging to a composite space that can be factored into individual states belonging to separate subspaces. A state is said to be entangled if it is not separable. In general, determining if a state is separable is not straightforward and the problem is classed as NP-hard.

Separability of bipartite systems 
Consider first composite states with two degrees of freedom, referred to as bipartite states. By a postulate of quantum mechanics these can be described as vectors in the tensor product space . In this discussion we will focus on the case of the Hilbert spaces  and  being finite-dimensional.

Pure states 

From the very definition of the tensor product, any vector of norm 1, i.e. a pure state of the composite system, can be written as
 
 

where  is a constant. 
If  can be written as a simple tensor, that is, in the form  with  a pure state in the i-th space, it is said to be a product state, and, in particular, separable. Otherwise it is called entangled. Note that, even though the notions of product and separable states coincide for pure states, they do not in the more general case of mixed states.

Pure states are entangled if and only if their partial states are not pure.

The state  is entangled if and only if . At the same time, the partial state has the form

It follows that  is pure --- that is, is projection with unit-rank --- if and only if , which is equivalent to  being separable.

Physically, this means that it is not possible to assign a definite (pure) state to the subsystems, which instead ought to be described as statistical ensembles of pure states, that is, as density matrices. A pure state  is thus entangled if and only if the von Neumann entropy of the partial state  is nonzero.

Formally, the embedding of a product of states into the product space is given by the Segre embedding. That is, a quantum-mechanical pure state is separable if and only if it is in the image of the Segre embedding.

The above discussion can be extended to the case of when the state space is infinite-dimensional with virtually nothing changed.

Mixed states

Consider the mixed state case.

where

Otherwise  is called an entangled state. It is clear from the definition that the family of separable states is a convex set.

In terms of quantum channels, a separable state can be created from any other state using local actions and classical communication while an entangled state cannot.

When the state spaces are infinite-dimensional, density matrices are replaced by positive trace class operators with trace 1, and a state is separable if it can be approximated, in trace norm, by states of the above form.

One property of the product state is that in terms of entropy,

Extending to the multipartite case 

The above discussion generalizes easily to the case of a quantum system consisting of more than two subsystems. Let a system have n subsystems and have state space . A pure state  is separable if it takes the form

Similarly, a mixed state ρ acting on H is separable if it is a convex sum

Or, in the infinite-dimensional case, ρ is separable if it can be approximated in the trace norm by states of the above form.

Separability criterion 

The problem of deciding whether a state is separable in general is sometimes called the separability problem in quantum information theory. It is considered to be a difficult problem. It has been shown to be NP-hard in many cases. and is believed to be so in general. Some appreciation for this difficulty can be obtained if one attempts to solve the problem by employing the direct brute force approach, for a fixed dimension. We see that the problem quickly becomes intractable, even for low dimensions. Thus more sophisticated formulations are required. The separability problem is a subject of current research.

A separability criterion is a necessary condition a state must satisfy to be separable. In the low-dimensional (2 X 2 and 2 X 3) cases, the Peres-Horodecki criterion is actually a necessary and sufficient condition for separability. Other separability criteria include (but not limited to) the range criterion, reduction criterion, and those based on uncertainty relations. See Ref. for a review of separability criteria in discrete variable systems.

In continuous variable systems, the Peres-Horodecki criterion also applies. Specifically, Simon  formulated a particular version of the Peres-Horodecki criterion in terms of the second-order moments of canonical operators and showed that it is necessary and sufficient for -mode Gaussian states (see Ref. for a seemingly different but essentially equivalent approach). It was later found  that Simon's condition is also necessary and sufficient for -mode Gaussian states, but no longer sufficient for -mode Gaussian states. Simon's condition can be generalized by taking into account the higher order moments of canonical operators  or by using entropic measures.

Characterization via algebraic geometry 

Quantum mechanics may be modelled on a projective Hilbert space, and the categorical product of two such spaces is the Segre embedding. In the bipartite case, a quantum state is separable if and only if it lies in the image of the Segre embedding.
Jon Magne Leinaas, Jan Myrheim and Eirik Ovrum in their paper "Geometrical aspects of entanglement" describe the problem and study the geometry of the separable states as a subset of the general state matrices. This subset have some intersection with the subset of states holding Peres-Horodecki criterion. In this paper, Leinaas et al. also give a numerical approach to test for separability in the general case.

Testing for separability 

Testing for separability in the general case is an NP-hard problem.  Leinaas et al. formulated an iterative, probabilistic algorithm for testing if a given state is separable. When the algorithm is successful, it gives an explicit, random, representation of the given state as a separable state. Otherwise it gives the distance of the given state from the nearest separable state it can find.

See also 
 Entanglement witness

References

External links 
 "StateSeparator" web-app

Quantum information science
Quantum states